Yanshou County is a county of Heilongjiang Province, Northeast China, it is under the administration of the prefecture-level city of Harbin, the capital of Heilongjiang. It borders Fangzheng County to the north, Shangzhi to the south, and Bin County to the northwest.

Administrative divisions 
Yanshou County is divided into 6 towns and 3 townships. 
6 towns
 Yanshou, Liutuan, Zhonghe, Jiaxin, Yanhe, Yuhe
3 townships
 Anshan, Shoushan, Qingchuan

Demographics

Climate

References

External links
  Government site - 

 
Yanshou